Sandro Dias, known as Mineirinho, is a Brazilian professional vert skateboarder who was born on April 18, 1975 in Santo André, São Paulo, Brazil and currently resides in Santa Ana, California.  He started skateboarding in 1986 and turned pro in 1995.  Best known for his high alley oop air tricks and for being one of ten people confirmed to have pulled the 900.  He won the gold medal at X Games 12 in Skateboard Vert. He is sponsored by  Red Bull, Oakley, & Positiv Skateboards. He won the world vert skateboarding titles in 2003, 2004, 2005, 2006, and 2007.

In 2011 Dias captured his sixth world vert skateboarding title.  He beat out his close friend and teammate 8-time champion Andy Macdonald by only 50 championship points.

External links
http://www.sandrodias.com/br
http://positivskateboards.com/
About.com
 EXPN.com
Lat34.com
maloofmoneycup.com

1975 births
Living people
People from Santo André, São Paulo
Sportspeople from Santa Ana, California
Brazilian skateboarders
X Games athletes
Sportspeople from São Paulo (state)